Paramanatham is a village in Sankarapuram Taluk, Kallakurichi district, Tamil Nadu.  census, the village had a population of 2284 people spread over 494 households. The nearest major town is Ulundurpettai.

References

Villages in Kallakurichi district